Scotodipnus is a genus of ground beetles in the family Carabidae. There are about 10 described species in Scotodipnus, found in Europe.

Species
These 10 species belong to the genus Scotodipnus:
 Scotodipnus affinis Baudi di Selve, 1871
 Scotodipnus alpinus Baudi di Selve, 1871
 Scotodipnus armellinii Ganglbauer, 1900
 Scotodipnus diottii (Magrini, 2008)
 Scotodipnus fagniezi Jeannel, 1937
 Scotodipnus glaber (Baudi di Selve, 1859)
 Scotodipnus grajus Jeannel, 1937
 Scotodipnus hirtus Dieck, 1869
 Scotodipnus mayeti Abeille de Perrin, 1892
 Scotodipnus subalpinus Baudi di Selve, 1871

References

Trechinae